Sir William Esturmy  (died 1427) (alias Sturmy), of Wolfhall, Wiltshire was an English  Knight of the Shire, Speaker of the House of Commons, and hereditary Warden of the royal forest of Savernake, Wiltshire.

Origins
He was born in about 1356, the son of Geoffrey Sturmy (d. 1381) and nephew and heir of Sir Henry Sturmy of Wolfhall in the Savernake Forest, Wiltshire.

Career
He succeeded his uncle in 1381 which brought him manors throughout Wiltshire, including Elvetham in the north of the county, where he created a 300-acre park, and Wolfhall and other manors in the east. He was knighted by October 1388. He held the post of hereditary warden of Savernake Forest from 1381 to 1417 and from 1420 until his death in 1427.

Between 1384 and 1422 he served as knight of the shire eight times for Wiltshire, twice for Hampshire (1384 and 1390) and twice for Devon (1391 and 1404). He was elected Speaker of the House of Commons in 1404 during the reign of King Henry IV, known as the Illiterate or Unlearned Parliament because the king forbade lawyers from attending. He was appointed High Sheriff of Wiltshire for 1418–19.

He held a number of public commissions and served several times as an ambassador abroad.

Marriage and children
He married Joan Crawthorne, the widow of Sir John Beaumont of Shirwell and Saunton in North Devon, by whom he had no sons, only two daughters and co-heiresses including:
Maud Esturmy, wife of Roger II Seymour (c.1367/70-1420), feudal barony of Hatch Beauchamp in Somerset, by whom she had a son John Seymour (d.1464).

Death
He died at Elvetham in 1427 and was buried at Easton Priory near Wolfhall. His heirs were his daughter Agnes (the wife of John Holcombe) and John Seymour (the son of Maud).

References

STURMY (ESTURMY), Sir William (c.1356-1427) of Wolf Hall in Great Bedwyn, Wilts

1350s births
1427 deaths
Year of birth uncertain
High Sheriffs of Wiltshire
Speakers of the House of Commons of England
English MPs April 1384
English MPs January 1390
English MPs 1401
English MPs 1417
English MPs 1422
English MPs November 1390
English MPs 1391
English MPs 1393
English MPs 1399
Members of the Parliament of England (pre-1707) for Devon